Beleswara Shiva Temple is a 9th-century Hindu temple of Lord Shiva. This is one of the oldest temple in Bhubaneswar (The Temple city of India), a well known heritage place and capital of Odisha. The festivals of this temple's are Shivratri and all Sankrantis.

Beleswara Shiva temple is on the Talabazar road, Old Town, Bhubaneswar. It is in the southern bank of the Bindusagar Tank and on the left side of Talabazar road leading from Lingaraja to Kedar-Gouri Lane. The temple faces east, and is in use. The presiding deity is a Shiva linga within a circular yoni pitha inside the sanctum.

The temple is under the care and maintenance of Devaraj Das.

The temple is surrounded by Sradha Mandapa on the east and residential buildings on the other three sides.

On plan the temple has a triratha vimana measuring 2.10 square metres with a frontal porch of 0.30 metres. On elevation the vimana is a rekha deul with usual bada, gandi and mastaka. The temple is in a dilapidated condition and partially buried, with cracks on all sides with vegetation growing and entry of rainwater. What exists at present is the bada and gandi. The remaining part of the bada measure 1.30 metres. ( 0.23 metres,  0.85 metres,  0.22 metres with two mouldings). The  measures 2.30 metres.

The niches are empty.

The door jambs are carved with three plain vertical bands that measures 1.08 metres in height and 0.88 metres in width.

References 

Shiva temples in Odisha
Hindu temples in Bhubaneswar
9th-century Hindu temples